American singer-songwriter, keyboardist and record producer George Duke released 32 studio albums, eight live albums, 19 collaborative albums (as a member of the George Duke Quartet, the George Duke Trio, the Cannonball Adderley Quintet, the Nat Adderley Sextet, The Mothers of Invention, the Billy Cobham/George Duke Band, the Clarke Duke Project, and the George Duke Band), and 47 singles.

Duke occasionally recorded under the name Dawilli Gonga, possibly for contractual reasons, when appearing on other artists albums.

Albums

Studio albums

Collaboration albums

Live albums

Singles

DVDs

Notes

References

External links
 George Duke discography at Discogs

Jazz discographies
Pop music discographies
Soul music discographies
Rock music discographies
Rhythm and blues discographies
Discographies of American artists